Ostitto is a 2016 Bangladeshi romantic drama film directed by Anonno Mamun and produced by Carlos Saleh under the Dream Box LTD. banner. The film stars Nusrat Imrose Tisha as an intellectually-disabled girl and Arifin Shuvoo as her mentor. The plot centers on the love story of two youths, and the struggle of a mentor who helps intellectually-disabled children to win an Olympic medal. Ostitto was released on 6 May 2016 in Bangladesh. The film received positive reviews from critics, who praised its performance and execution. The director announced
in 2017 that Ostitto 2 will be released with new faces.

Cast
 Arifin Shuvoo as Imtu
 Nusrat Imrose Tisha as Pori
 Nijhum Rubina as Orsha
 Shuchorita as Mrs. Afsana, Pori's mother
 Subrata as Mr. Jamil, Pori's father
 Sujata as Pori's grandmother
 Farhan Ahmed Jovan as Pori's brother
 Samonty Shoumi as Zara
 Don as Joga Bhai
 Tanzira Noor as Imtu's sister
 Jacky Alamgir as Ramiz
 Badol as Jalil

Production

Directed by Anonno Mamun, the film centres on an affair between autistic Tisha and her teacher Arifin.

In an interview with The Daily Star, the two stars said that the bulk of shooting took place in an autistic school. Many characters in the film are autistic students of the school. "Autistic people can’t tell a lie," said Arifin describing his experiences during filming. "As we spent a lot of time with them, we became a part of them," he said.

"I had to study the autistic students for my role," said Tisha. "This is completely a new experience for me," she added.

Promotion
Ahead of the release of this film, Shuvo, Tisha and others of the cast and crew of the film assisted with rigorous promotional campaigns in Dhaka. As a surprise, the lead duo performed one of the songs in the soundtrack, "Hero", penned by Lyricist Mehedi Hasan Limon.

One line of dialogue from the film has become popular - “আমি শিক্ষক,সভ্যতার জন্য মেরুদন্ড গড়ি আর অসভ্যদের মেরুদন্ড ভাংগি। , it means "I am a teacher! I build the backbone of civilization and break the backbone of the uncivilized barbarians!"

Music
All lyrics are written by Kabir Bakul, Adhyan Dhara, Zahid Akbar, Mehadi Hasan Limon,
Arzeen Kamal and Priyo Chattopadhyay, The hit song, Ayna Bolna is composed by Naved Parvez

Release
The film was released on 6 May 2016 in more than 65 screens across Bangladesh. The film opened to a positive response at the
theaters. It was popular across generations, especially among young or university-age viewers. However, it was criticized by some for the quality of its editing. It performed below average at the box office. Ostitto'' was also released in Canada on one screen.

See also
 Dhallywood

References

2016 films
2016 romantic drama films
Bengali-language Bangladeshi films
Bangladeshi romantic drama films
Films shot in Dhaka
Films scored by Ibrar Tipu
Films scored by Akassh
2010s Bengali-language films
Films directed by Anonno Mamun